Hector de Lima Polanco (born 24 March 1911, date of death unknown) was a Venezuelan sports shooter. He competed at the 1952 Summer Olympics and 1956 Summer Olympics.

References

External links
 

1911 births
Year of death missing
Venezuelan male sport shooters
Olympic shooters of Venezuela
Shooters at the 1952 Summer Olympics
Shooters at the 1956 Summer Olympics
Place of birth missing
20th-century Venezuelan people